Stock transfer may be:

Stock transfer agent, an individual or organisation involved in transferring the name and certificate of one master shareholder of stock to another.
Stock transfer (housing), the process in which ownership of council housing is transferred to a housing association.
Empty stock transfer, the act of moving rolling stock from one destination to another without carrying passengers or freight